Custer Township is located in Will County, Illinois. As of the 2010 census, its population was 1,430 and it contained 612 housing units.

History
Custer Township was organized in 1886, and named after George Armstrong Custer (1839–1876), an American Civil War general and Indian fighter.

Geography

Demographics

References

External links
City-data.com
Will County Official Site
Illinois State Archives

Townships in Will County, Illinois
Townships in Illinois
1886 establishments in Illinois